Glen Keith Bruk-Jackson (born 25 April 1969) is a former Zimbabwean cricketer.

A right-handed batsman, Bruk-Jackson played in two Test matches and one One Day International for Zimbabwe, all during their tour of Pakistan in December 1993. He played domestically for Mashonaland Country Districts and later Mashonaland.

1969 births
Living people
Alumni of Falcon College
Zimbabwe Test cricketers
Zimbabwe One Day International cricketers
Zimbabwean cricketers
Mashonaland cricketers
Cricketers from Harare
White Zimbabwean sportspeople